Joseph Édouard Stevens (26 November 1816 – 2 August 1892) was a Belgian animalier painter and engraver.

Life 

He was the son of Jean François Léopold Stevens (1791–1837), a Brussels art dealer and collector, and the elder brother of the painter Alfred Stevens and of the art critic Arthur Stevens (1825 – 1890). He frequented as a dilettante the Académie Royale des Beaux-Arts and followed courses by Louis Robbe and Eugène Verboeckhoven.

Partly self-taught, he finished his training in Paris, without enrolling in a school, and frequented the studio of Alexandre-Gabriel Decamps, as well as painters of the Barbizon School and of the "Groupe du Restaurant du Havre" including Thomas Couture, Eugène Isabey, Théodore Rousseau and others.

He exhibited at the Brussels Salon from 1842.

In 1852 he joined his two brothers in Paris where he lived for several years, dividing his time between the worldliness of the Imperial Court, in particular the Jardin des Tuileries, and the Bohemianism of café life. He executed many drawings of horses in the Bois de Boulogne which he exhibited in Amsterdam in 1854, and later in Dijon in 1858. He became acquainted with Charles Baudelaire, whom he met again in Brussels in 1864. The poet dedicated to him the piece Les Bons Chiens ("Good Dogs"), the penultimate work, preceding Épilogue, in the collection Petits poèmes en prose. (Dogs were Stevens' preferred subject matter). He finally returned to live in Brussels in 1869.

His work attracted many patrons, notably Henri Van Cutsem; King Leopold II also bought paintings of his. Despite (or perhaps because of) his success, he fell prey to alcohol in his later years.

Ernest Meissonier painted his portrait, and a street in the city of Brussels (connecting the district of Marolles to that of Sablon), is named after him.

Works 
Stevens produced mostly canvases showing domestic animals (generally dogs, monkeys and horses) in sometimes curious or run-down settings far removed from Romanticism. This realism, of which he was one of the pioneers, attracted the interest from the 1850s of predominantly French critics and intellectuals, particularly Baudelaire and also Léon Cladel, who was inspired by Stevens' paintings to write Léon Cladel et sa kyrielle de chiens (1885).

Museum holdings 
 Royal Museum of Fine Arts Antwerp
 Royal Museums of Fine Arts of Belgium
 Belfius Art Collection
 Museum of Fine Arts, Ghent
 Musée des beaux-arts de Marseille: A la porte
 Musée d'Orsay: Le Supplice de Tantale
 Mu.ZEE (Kunstmuseum aan zee), Ostend
 Musée des beaux-arts de Rouen: Un métier de chien

Gallery

Notes and references

Further reading 

 Berko, P. & V., 1981 (?): Dictionary of Belgian painters born between 1750 & 1875. Laconti
 Fierens, Paul, 1931: Joseph Stevens. Éditions des cahiers de Belgique
 Vanzype, Gustave, 1936: Les frères Stevens. Bruxelles: Nouvelle Société d'édition
 Verlant, Ernest, 1978: Dictionnaire des artistes belges de 1830 à 1970. Bruxelles: Arto

1816 births
1892 deaths
Artists from Brussels
19th-century Belgian painters
19th-century Belgian male artists
Dog artists